Libya competed at the 2019 African Games held from 19 to 31 August 2019 in Rabat, Morocco. In total, athletes representing Libya won two silver medals and two bronze medals and the country finished in 29th place in the medal table, shared with Mali.

Medal summary

Medal table 

|  style="text-align:left; width:78%; vertical-align:top;"|

|  style="text-align:left; width:22%; vertical-align:top;"|

Archery 

Muhanad Almujreesi competed in the men's individual event.

Athletics 

Hadel Aboud competed in the women's 100 metres event. She was disqualified after a false start. She also competed in the women's long jump event.

Retag Asaiah was scheduled to compete in the women's discus throw and women's hammer throw events.

Mohamed Mansour finished in 4th place in the men's discus throw event.

Boxing 

Two athletes are scheduled to represent Libya in boxing: Ibrahim Ali and Abdlbasit Bin Khayr.

Chess 

Abobker Elarabi competed in chess in the men's rapid individual and men's blitz individual events.

Fencing 

Abdussalam Abujtela, Abdulmalek Al Ghadi and Khaled Buhdeima are scheduled to compete in fencing.

Judo 

Two athletes represented Libya in judo: Mohamed Senusi (Men's -100 kg) and Ali Omar (Men's +100 kg).

Karate 

Hussin Alturki, Mohamed Dabaa and Gebril Mohamed competed in karate.

Rowing 

Two athletes represented Libya in rowing: Alhussein Gambour and Abdussalam Said.

Swimming 

Audai Hassouna competed in swimming in the men's 100 metres freestyle and in the men's 200 metres freestyle events.

Taekwondo 

Taha Alaswad (men's –87 kg) and Ramadan Elwafi (men's –68 kg) competed in Taekwondo.

Volleyball 

Fuad Elmaarug and Mohamed Ikhbayri competed in beach volleyball in the men's tournament.

Weightlifting 

Ahmed Abuzriba (men's 89 kg), Abdullah Bousheehah (men's 61 kg) and Ahsaan Shabi (men's 67 kg) competed in weightlifting.

Shabi won the silver medal in his event.

References 

Nations at the 2019 African Games
2019
African Games